Anastasia Pollard is an American-born English painter.

Life and career 
Pollard was raised in Virginia and educated at the Pennsylvania Academy of Fine Arts. She then attended the Florence Academy of Art before apprenticing from 1993 to 1995. Pollard has lived in London since 2006.

Pollard won the Ondaatje Prize for Portraiture at the Royal Society of Portrait Painters Annual Exhibition for 2009.

Pollard is a member of the Royal Society of Portrait Painters, a founder of the London Atelier for Representational Art (LARA).

Awards 
 Ondaatje Prize for Portraiture at the Royal Society of Portrait Painters Annual Exhibition (2009)
 The Artist's House Gallery Award (2000)
 Gross McCleaf Gallery Prize (2000)
 Earl T. Donelson Figure Painting Award (2000)
 Hobson Pittman Memorial Prize, Special Notice (2000)
 The William Emlen Cresson Scholarship (1999)
 Linda Lee Alter Award (1999)
 Celia Beaux Memorial Prize (1999)
 Melvin Paul and Pearl Miller Carpel Award
 Lucille Sorgenti Scholarship (1999)
 Silvia S. and Miron M. Walley Memorial Scholarship (1999)
 Benjamin West Prize (1999)

References 

English women painters
Living people
People from Virginia
Year of birth missing (living people)
21st-century British women artists
21st-century English women
21st-century English people